Bob Seale (born October 4, 1941) is an American politician who served as the Treasurer of Nevada from 1991 to 1999 and in the Nevada Assembly from the 21st district from 2004 to 2006.

References

1941 births
Living people
State treasurers of Nevada
Republican Party members of the Nevada Assembly